BNF for Children (BNFC) is the standard UK paediatric reference for prescribing and pharmacology.

It contains a wide range of information and advice on prescribing for children - from newborn to adolescence.  
The entries are classified by group of drug, giving cautions for use, side effects, indications and dose for most of the drugs available for children in the UK National Health Service. It also includes information on the unlicensed uses of certain drugs. Though published in and for the United Kingdom, the vast bulk of the clinical information will apply in any country.

Authorship and Publication
The BNFC is jointly published annually by BMJ (owned by the BMA), Pharmaceutical Press (owned by the RPS), Royal College of Paediatrics and Child Health, and the Neonatal and Paediatric Pharmacists Group. The principal contributors are acknowledged in the front pages. 

It is overseen by the BNFC Paediatric Formulary Committee
 
and edited by a team of pharmacists.

History
The BNF for Children developed from the British National Formulary (BNF), which prior to 2005 had provided information on the treatment of children, with the doses largely determined by calculations based on the body weight of the child. 
The guidance was provided by pharmacists and doctors whose expertise was in the care of adults.

This was an anomaly, 
as in relation to responses to medicines, the difference between a newborn and a sixteen year old is greater than the difference between a sixteen year old and a sixty year old. Starting in 2002, Prof Martin Kendall, then chairman of the BNF Joint Formulary Committee worked to get things changed.

The UK Department of Health (now the DHSC) agreed to fund the BNFC, as it does the BNF, to ensure that NHS clinicians can have up to date information in their pockets.  
The first edition was published in 2005, with George Rylance

chairing the Paediatric Formulary Committee and Dinesh Mehta as the first executive editor.  
Anne, the Princess Royal attended the launch on 14 July.

Editions
The BNFC is published annually, but electronic updates

are produced monthly. The current 2022-2023 edition was published in September 2022.

Availability
Though not aimed at the general public, the BNFC, like the BNF, is available for purchase. 

It is provided to NHS staff - usually through their employer, but may be accessed online through MedicinesComplete.  

The app is available through the usual app stores.

Contents
 How BNF publications are constructed
 How to use BNF Publications in print
 Changes
 Guidance on Prescribing
 Prescription writing
 Supply of medicines
 Emergency supply of medicines
 Controlled drugs and drug dependence
 Adverse reactions to drugs
 Guidance on intravenous infusions
 Prescribing in hepatic impairment
 Prescribing in renal impairment
 Prescribing in pregnancy
 Prescribing in breast-feeding
 Prescribing in palliative care
 Drugs and sport
 Medicines optimisation
 Antimicrobial stewardship
 Prescribing in dental practice
 NOTES ON DRUGS AND PREPARATIONS
 1 Gastro-intestinal system
 2 Cardiovascular system
 3 Respiratory system
 4 Nervous system
 5 Infection
 6 Endocrine system
 7 Genito-urinary system
 8 Immune system and malignant disease
 9 Blood and nutrition
 10 Musculoskeletal system
 11 Eye
 12 Ear, nose and oropharynx
 13 Skin
 14 Vaccines
 15 Anaesthesia
 16 Emergency treatment of poisoning
 APPENDICES AND INDICES
 Interactions
 Borderline substances
 Cautionary and advisory labels for dispensed medicines
 Dental Practitioners’ Formulary
 Nurse Prescribers’ Formulary
 Non-medical prescribing
 Index of manufacturers
 Special-order Manufacturers
 Index
 Medical emergencies in the community

See also
 British National Formulary
 Pharmacopeia
 Pharmacy
 Specification (technical standard)
 Royal Pharmaceutical Society
 Pharmaceutical Press

References

External links 
 Pharmaceutical Press
 BNF
 BNFC
 Neonatal & Paediatric Pharmacists Group
 Royal College of Paediatrics and Child Health
 British Medical Association

Pharmacology literature
Pharmaceuticals policy
Professional associations based in the United Kingdom
Pharmacy in the United Kingdom